Tatyana Grigoryevna Vasilyeva (born 28 February 1947) is a Soviet and Russian theater and film actress, and TV presenter. She has appeared in more than seventy films since 1969. She was named a People's Artist of the Russian Federation in 1992.

Biography
She graduated from the Moscow Art Theatre School (course of  Vasiliy Markov) in 1969. In 1969–1983, she acted at the Moscow Satire Theater. Her first theatre role was as the Commissioner in The Time in Captivity, based on a play by Alexander Stein.

From 1983 to 1992, she performed at the Moscow Academic Mayakovsky Theatre.

Since 1996, she has been acting at The School of Modern Play.

From June 4 to August 31, 2012, she led the program Between Us, Girls on Channel One, and, from April 1 to May 30, 2014, moderated Your case... on Channel One.

Selected filmography
 1975 — Hello, I'm Your Aunt! as Annie
 1979  — Kind Men as Iraida Yaroslavna
 1980 — The Evening Labyrinth as Eleonora
 1985 — The Most Charming and Attractive as Susanna
 1992 — White King, Red Queen as Yekaterina
 1998 — The Circus Burned Down, and the Clowns Have Gone as Margarita
 2005 — Popsa as Larisa Ivanovna
 2007 — Waiting for a Miracle as Renata Genrikhovna
 2012 — Svaty as Viktoria Viktorovna

Personal life
Her first husband (1973-1983) was actor Anatoly Vasilyev (born 1946), People's Artist of the Russian Federation (1994).  Their son, Philip (born July 30, 1978), is an actor. The second husband (1983-1995) was actor Georgy Martirosyan (born 1948), Honored Artist of the Russian Federation (2004). Their daughter is Elizaveta  Martirosyan (born November 5, 1986).

References

External links
 

1947 births
Living people
Actresses from Saint Petersburg
Soviet film actresses
Soviet television actresses
Soviet stage actresses
Soviet voice actresses
Russian film actresses
Russian television actresses
Russian stage actresses
Russian voice actresses
20th-century Russian actresses
21st-century Russian actresses
Recipients of the Order of Honour (Russia)
People's Artists of Russia
Russian television presenters
Recipients of the Nika Award
Russian women television presenters
Moscow Art Theatre School alumni